Gyromitus is a genus of cercozoans.

It is a thaumatomonad.

References

Imbricatea
Cercozoa genera